Skelhøje is a small Danish village with a population of 485 (1 January 2022). It is located near Dollerup Hills in central Jutland.

The Herning-Viborg state railway line was opened in 1906 to develop economy in a remote part of Jutland. One of the new stations on the railway line was Skelhøje Station on a place with no inhabitants. During some decades Skelhøje grew to a place of some commercial importance with shops, dairy, bakery, slaughterhouse etc. The railway line closed in 1971. The former inn is today the community house, run by the villagers (Skelhøje Kulturhus), and with rooms for rent for hikers.

References

External links 
 www.skelhøje.dk

Cities and towns in the Central Denmark Region
Populated places established in 1906
1906 establishments in Denmark
Viborg Municipality